Rian Swastedian (born 1 April 1995) is an Indonesian badminton player from the Jaya Raya badminton club. He was part of the Indonesia Junior team that won the bronze medal at the 2013 Asian Junior Championships. Swastedian was promoted to join the national team in 2014. He was the mixed doubles champion at the 2015 Vietnam International Series tournament partnered with Masita Mahmudin.

Achievements

BWF International Challenge/Series (2 titles, 2 runners-up) 
Men's doubles

Mixed doubles

 BWF International Challenge tournament
 BWF International Series tournament

Performance timeline

Indonesian team 
 Junior level

Individual competitions 
 Junior level

 Senior level

References

External links 
 

Living people
1995 births
People from Boyolali Regency
Sportspeople from Central Java
Indonesian male badminton players
21st-century Indonesian people